Events from the year 1584 in Ireland.

Incumbent
Monarch: Elizabeth I

Events
July – English government commissions a survey of Munster, following the Desmond Rebellions. Sir Valentine Browne is appointed to the task. It becomes known as the Peyton Survey after Sir Christopher Peyton
The Spanish Arch is built in Galway.
Perrott subdivides Cavan into seven baronies.
Richard Stanihurst's history De rebus in Hibernia gestis is published by Christophe Plantin in Antwerp.

Births

Deaths
June 20 – Dermot O'Hurley, Roman Catholic Archbishop of Cashel, put to death for treason. (b. c. 1530)
Margaret Ball, died of deprivation in the dungeons of Dublin Castle, beatified in 1992 (b. 1515)
Sir Henry Colley, or Cowley, an Irish soldier and landowner.

References

 
1580s in Ireland
Ireland